The Sri Lanka Prisons Emergency Action and Tactical Force (SPEAT FORCE) was formed in 2022 under the Department of Prisons, following the restructure of the former prison intelligence unit by the Minister of Justice. The unit is tasked with security duties, protection of special prisoners/suspects, riot control and other duties. It consists of ex-military personnel.

See also
 Judiciary of Sri Lanka
 Law of Sri Lanka

References

External links
Official website

Paramilitary organisations based in Sri Lanka
Law enforcement in Sri Lanka
Penal system in Sri Lanka